Larrea is a genus of flowering plants in the caltrop family, Zygophyllaceae. It contains five species of evergreen shrubs that are native to the Americas. The generic name honours Bishop Juan Antonio Hernández Pérez de Larrea, a patron of science. South American members of this genus are known as jarillas and can produce fertile interspecific hybrids. One of the more notable species is the creosote bush (L. tridentata) of the southwestern United States and northwestern Mexico. The King Clone ring in the Mojave Desert is a creosote bush clonal colony estimated to be about 11,700 years old.

Species
Larrea ameghinoi
Larrea cuneifolia
Larrea divaricata Cav.
Larrea nitida
Larrea tridentata (DC.) Coville – creosote bush

References 

 T. J. Mabry, J. H. Hunziker, and D. R. Di Feo, D. R. (Eds.). Creosote Bush: Biology and Chemistry of Larrea in New World Deserts US/IBP Synthesis Series N° 6 (Dowden, Hutchinson and Ross, Inc. PA, 1977)
 Juan H. Hunziker and Cecilia Comas, "Larrea interspecific hybrids revisited (Zygophyllaceae)" Darwiniana, 40(1-4): pp. 33–38 (2002)

External links

 
Taxa named by Antonio José Cavanilles